San Giovanni Battista  is a Roman Catholic parish church located in the town of Olmeneta in the province of Cremona, region of Lombardy, Italy.

History
The church was rebuilt in the late 19th through 20th century, but retains the earlier Baroque architecture influence, for example in the facade with rounded tympanum.

References

20th-century Roman Catholic church buildings in Italy
Churches in the province of Cremona